All Saints' Church is the parish church of Leamington Spa, Warwickshire, England. It is a grade II* listed building.

Background
Built in the Gothic Revival style in the 19th century, it has been described as "one of the largest Church of England parish churches, rivaling many cathedrals in size." It is located in the centre of the town, just south of the River Leam in what was the old core of the town.

History 
The Domesday Book of 1086 reports that there was a priest present in "Lamintone", (an old name for Leamington) although there is no specific mention of a church. The earliest record of one was from the 12th century when Leamington was still a tiny hamlet in the parish of Leek Wootton. A west tower was added in the 14th century whilst a south porch was put added in the 18th. The first spring (of many that made Leamington famous) was located just outside the main entrance of the church of land owned by the Earl of Aylesford.

It was however in 1843 that the church began to take its current form and shape. By this time the church was no longer in open fields just to the north of a hamlet, but was in the centre of a bustling spa town. (Two of Leamington's town founders, Benjamin Satchwell and William Abbotts, are buried in the churchyard.)

The main construction took place between 1843 and 1869, overseen and largely funded by vicar John Craig. Designs were drawn up by architect J.G. Jackson of Leamington, but Craig is reported to have been largely his own architect.

In 1867 the south transept was added by the architect TC Barry.

The last major works to take place to the church, after Craig's death, were from 1898 to 1902 by the architect Sir Arthur Blomfield, when two western bays to the nave and a south western bell tower were added. The seating capacity was increased to around 2000. From September 2007 to February 2008 the church precincts were redeveloped and a new sculpture, entitled 'Spring', was installed on the site of the original Leamington spa spring.

The church today 
The church remains in active use as a place of worship, with Sunday and other major services accompanied by the surpliced choir. Despite the fragmentation of its parish during the 19th century, All Saints is still known and used as Leamington's Parish Church. The church hosts and promotes organ recitals and concerts, as well as the annual All Saints' Arts Festival. It also runs a group for LGBTQIA+ Christians called LGBTXians. There is a lively Ukrainian cafe inside the church, which opens every day except Sunday.

Vicars of Leamington from 1823

Robert Downes 1823 – 1839
John Craig 1839 – 1877
The Hon. J.W. Leigh 1877 – 1884
Walter Furneaux 1884 – 1896
Cecil Hook 1896 – 1906
W. Armstrong Buck 1906 – 1916
Frederick Feist 1916 – 1933
G.C. Rolfe 1933 – 1943
R.C. Streatfield 1943 – 1959
Anthony Rouse 1959 – 1963
Idwal Jones 1963 – 1980
Ian Campbell 1980 – 1991
J. Gareth Miller 1991–1993
Interregnum 1993 – 1995
George Warner 1995 – 2002 (Priest-in-Charge of All Saints and of Holy Trinity)
Christopher Wilson 2003 – current (Priest-in-Charge, later Vicar of All Saints and of Holy Trinity)

Directors of Music
Peter Smith
Simon Tayton
Bea van der Kaaij 
Julian Parkin 2008 – 2013
David Williams, FRCO 2013 – 2014
Simon Lawford, BA, MA, FRCO 2014
Richard Cook, BA 2014
Simon Tayton, BA, MSc, FCMI 2014 – 2017
Suzanne Green, BA, MA 2018 – 2019
Suzanne Green & Alex Silverman (Job Share) 2019–2022
Alex Silverman 2022-present

Organ
The church has a pipe organ by William Hill & Sons dating from 1879. There have been subsequent rebuilds by Hill, Norman and Beard in 1926, and Longstaff & Jones in 1981. The organ is described in the National Pipe Organ Register.

List of organists
Henry T Elliston 1820   
Henry Matthews	1864   
Thomas Bladon	1876   
Frank Spinney, FCO 1878  
Walter Spinney	1888  	
W H Bellamy 1894  	
Lionel Wiggins, Hon RCM FRCO ARCM 1922  	
Robert Dickinson, BMus FRCO LRAM 1951  
Hugh Large, FRCO ARCM 1956  	
Neil Wade, ARCM, ARCO 1964  	
Graham Steed, BMus FRCO 1965  
Alan Jones	1967  
Derrick Stiff	1968  
Keith Sedgebeer, BA 1970  	
David M Palmer	1972  	
Robert E Munns, FRAM, ARCO, ARCM 1983  	
John Wilks, BA BMus FRCO 1987  	
Colin Druce, GBSM FRCO ARCM 1988  
Sean Montgomery, ARCO 1998  	
Jeremy Meager, ARCO 2007  
Cynthia Hall, MA FRCO 2009  
David Williams, FRCO 2012
Christopher Beaumont, MA FTCL 2019

References

Gothic Revival church buildings in England
Leamington, All Saints Church
Leamington, All Saints Church
Buildings and structures in Leamington Spa
Anglo-Catholic church buildings in Warwickshire
Leamington, All Saints Church
Arthur Blomfield church buildings